The Freedom 38 is an American sailboat, that was designed by Gary Mull and first built in 1989.

The Freedom 38 is a development of the Freedom 36.

Production

The boat was built by Tillotson Pearson in the United States for Freedom Yachts, starting in 1989. The design is out of production.

Design
The Freedom 38 is a small recreational keelboat, built predominantly of fiberglass, with wood trim. It has a free-standing fractional sloop rig, an internally-mounted spade-type rudder and a fixed fin wing keel. It displaces  and carries  of lead ballast.

See also
List of sailing boat types

References

Keelboats
1980s sailboat type designs
Sailing yachts
Sailboat type designs by Gary Mull
Sailboat types built by Pearson Yachts